Lanta is a commune in the Haute-Garonne department in southwestern France.

History
The attempt of the capitoul Pierre Hunault, sieur de Lanta, to seize control of Toulouse's Capitol was the immediate cause of the 1562 riots there.

Population

Monument

See also
Communes of the Haute-Garonne department

References

Communes of Haute-Garonne